The Ford Fiesta RS WRC is the World Rally Car built for the Ford World Rally Team by Ford Europe and M-Sport for use in the World Rally Championship 2011–2016. It is based upon the Ford Fiesta road car, and replaced the Ford Focus RS WRC, which competed in various versions since 1999. It is also built to the new World Rally Car regulations for 2011, which are based upon the existing Super 2000 regulations, but is powered by a turbocharged 1.6-litre engine (1.6 L turbo Ford EcoBoost engine) rather than the normally aspirated 2-litre engine found in Super 2000 cars. M-Sport and Ford introduced a Super 2000 version of the Ford Fiesta at the beginning of 2010, which forms the base of the WRC car.

Stobart Ford World Rally Team drivers Matthew Wilson and Henning Solberg have carried out much of the development work on the car during 2010, with Per-Gunnar Andersson and M-Sport managing director and Ford team director Malcolm Wilson have also driven the car.

From 2017, it was replaced by Ford Fiesta WRC. Still some privateers enter this car to rally competitions.

WRC victories (Fiesta RS WRC)

RRC version

In 2012, the RRC version of the Fiesta was launched to comply with the regional rally rules of the FIA; it is basically a Fiesta RS WRC, only with an S2000-specification rear wing, a slightly different front bumper, a lighter flywheel and a 30mm restrictor instead of a 33mm one found in the WRC variant. The Fiesta's with RRC specification can be converted to WRC specification in 6 hours.

WRC-2 victories (Fiesta RRC)

Ford Fiesta RS WRC 'Evolution'

In Rally Finland 2014 M-Sport launched a facelifted version of the Fiesta RS WRC. Despite the change on the front of the car, it's still the same under the bonnet. M-Sport later revealed the 'Evolution' version would come in 2015.

Before Rally Portugal 2015, M-Sport launched the 'Evolution' specification of the Fiesta RS WRC. Unlike the first version's engine which was built by Pipo Motors, the new Fiesta RS WRC's engine is completely built by M-Sport, with technical support from Ford. The car has also undergone a full redesign under the bonnet with further developments to the cooling package, transmission, electronics, wiring harness and differentials.

See also
 Citroën DS3 WRC
 Citroën C3 WRC
 Hyundai i20 WRC
 Hyundai i20 Coupe WRC
 Mini John Cooper Works WRC
 Toyota Yaris WRC
 Volkswagen Polo R WRC

References

External links

 Ford Motor Company
 M-Sport
 The History of the car from ItalianWRC.com website
 Ford Racing
 Ford Fiesta RS WRC – juwra.com

World Rally Cars
Fiesta RS WRC